Tissue transglutaminase (abbreviated as tTG or TG2) is a 78-kDa, calcium-dependent enzyme of the protein-glutamine γ-glutamyltransferases family (or simply transglutaminase family). Like other transglutaminases, it crosslinks proteins between an ε-amino group of a lysine residue and a γ-carboxamide group of glutamine residue, creating an inter- or intramolecular bond that is highly resistant to proteolysis (protein degradation). Aside from its crosslinking function, tTG catalyzes other types of reactions including deamidation, GTP-binding/hydrolyzing, and isopeptidase activities.  Unlike other members of the transglutaminase family, tTG can be found both in the intracellular and the extracellular spaces of various types of tissues and is found in many different organs including the heart, the liver, and the small intestine. Intracellular tTG is abundant in the cytosol but smaller amounts can also be found in the nucleus and the mitochondria.  Intracellular tTG is thought to play an important role in apoptosis. In the extracellular space, tTG binds to proteins of the extracellular matrix (ECM), binding particularly tightly to fibronectin.  Extracellular tTG has been linked to cell adhesion, ECM stabilization, wound healing, receptor signaling, cellular proliferation, and cellular motility.

tTG is the autoantigen in celiac disease, a lifelong illness in which the consumption of dietary gluten causes a pathological immune response resulting in the inflammation of the small intestine and subsequent villous atrophy. It has also been implicated in the pathophysiology of many other diseases, including such as many different cancers and neurogenerative diseases.

Structure

Gene
The human tTG gene is located on the 20th chromosome (20q11.2-q12).

Protein
TG2 is a multifunctional enzyme that belongs to transglutaminases which catalyze the crosslinking of proteins by epsilon-(gamma-glutamyl)lysine isopeptide bonds. Similarly to other transglutaminases, tTG consists of a GTP/ GDP binding site, a catalytic domain, two beta barrel and a beta-sandwich. Crystal structures of TG2 with bound GDP, GTP, or ATP have demonstrated that these forms of TG2 adopt a "closed" conformation, whereas TG2 with the active site occupied by an inhibitory gluten peptide mimic or other similar inhibitors adopts an "open" conformation. In the open conformation the four domains of TG2 are arranged in an extended configuration, allowing for catalytic activity, whereas in the closed conformation the two C-terminal domains are folded in on the catalytic core domain which includes the residue Cys-277. The N-terminal domain only shows minor structural changes between the two different conformations.

Mechanism

The catalytic mechanism for crosslinking in human tTG involves the thiol group from a Cys residue in the active site of tTG.  The thiol group attacks the carboxamide of a glutamine residue on the surface of a protein or peptide substrate, releasing ammonia, and producing a thioester intermediate.  The thioester intermediate can then be attacked by the surface amine of a second substrate (typically from a lysine residue). The end product of the reaction is a stable isopeptide bond between the two substrates (i.e. crosslinking).  Alternatively, the thioester intermediate can be hydrolyzed, resulting in the net conversion of the glutamine residue to glutamic acid (i.e. deamidation). The deamidation of glutamine residues catalyzed by tTG is thought to be linked to the pathological immune response to gluten in celiac disease.  A schematic for the crosslinking and the deamidation reactions is provided in Figure 1.

Regulation

The expression of tTG is regulated at the transcriptional level depending on complex signal cascades. Once synthesized, most of the protein is found in the cytoplasm, plasma membrane and ECM, but a small fraction is translocated to the nucleus, where it participates in the control of its own expression through the regulation of transcription factors.

Crosslinking activity by tTG requires the binding of Ca2+ ions. Multiple Ca2+ can bind to a single tTG molecule. Specifically, tTG binds up to 6 calcium ions at 5 different binding sites. Mutations to these binding sites causing lower calcium affinity, decrease the enzyme's transglutaminase activity. In contrast, the binding of one molecule of GTP or GDP inhibits the crosslinking activity of the enzyme.  Therefore, intracellular tTG is mostly inactive due to the relatively high concentration of GTP/GDP and the low levels of calcium inside the cell.  Although extracellular tTG is expected to be active due to the low concentration of guanine nucleotides and the high levels of calcium in the extracellular space, evidence has shown that extracellular tTG is mostly inactive. Recent studies suggest that extracellular tTG is kept inactive by the formation of a disulfide bond between two vicinal cysteine residues, namely Cys 370 and Cys 371.  When this disulfide bond forms, the enzyme remains in an open confirmation but becomes catalytically inactive. The, oxidation/reduction of the disulfide bond serves as a third allosteric regulatory mechanism (along with GTP/GDP and Ca2+) for the activation of tTG. Thioredoxin-1 has been shown to activate extracellular tTG by reducing the disulfide bond. Another disuplhide bond can form in tTG, between the residues Cys-230 and Cys-370. While this bond does not exist in the enzyme's native state, it appears when the enzyme is inactivated via oxidation. The presence of calcium protects against the formation of both disulfide bonds, thus making the enzyme more resistant to oxidation.

Recent studies have suggested that interferon-γ may serve as an activator of extracellular tTG in the small intestine; these studies have a direct implication to the pathogenesis of celiac disease. Activation of tTG has been shown to be accompanied by large conformational changes, switching from a compact (inactive) to an extended (active) conformation. (see Figure 3)

In the extracellular matrix, TG2 is "turned off", due primarily to the oxidizing activity of endoplasmic reticulum protein 57 (ERp57). Thus, tTG is allosterically regulated by two separate proteins, Erp57 and TRX-1. (See Figure 4).

Function 
tTG is expressed ubiquitously and is present in various cellular compartments, such as the cytosol, the nucleus, and the plasma membrane. It requires calcium as a cofactor for transamidation activity. Transcription is increased by retinoic acid. Among its many supposed functions, it appears to play a role in wound healing, apoptosis, and extracellular matrix development as well as differentiation and cell adhesion. It has been noted that tTG may have very different activity in different cell types. For example, in neurons, tTG supports the survival of cells subjected to injury whereas in astrocytes knocking out the gene expression for tTG is beneficial to cell survival.
 
tTG is thought to be involved in the regulation of the cytoskeleton by crosslinking various cytoskeletal proteins  including myosin,  actin, and spectrin.  Evidence shows that intracellular tTG crosslinks itself to myosin. It is also believed that tTG may stabilize the structure of the dying cells during apoptosis by polymerizing the components of the cytoskeleton, therefore preventing the leakage of the cellular contents into the extracellular space.

tTG also has GTPase activity: In the presence of GTP, it suggested to function as a G protein participating in signaling processes. Besides its transglutaminase activity, tTG is proposed to also act as kinase, and protein disulfide isomerase, and deamidase. This latter activity is important in the deamidation of gliadin peptides, thus playing important role in the pathology of coeliac disease.

tTG also presents PDI (Protein Disulfide Isomerase) activity. Based on its PDI activity, tTG plays an important role in the regulation of proteostasis, by catalyzing the trimerization of HSF1 (Heat Shock Factor 1) and thus the body's response to heat shock. In the absence of tTG, the response to heat shock is impaired since the necessary trimer is not formed.

Clinical significance 
tTG is the most comprehensively studied transglutaminase and has been associated with many diseases. However, none of these diseases are related to an enzyme deficiency. Indeed, thus far no disease has been attributed to the lack of tTG activity and this has been attested through the study of tTG knockout mice.

Celiac Disease 

tTG is best known for its link with celiac disease. It was first associated with celiac disease in 1997 when the enzyme was found to be the antigen recognized by the antibodies specific to celiac. Anti-transglutaminase antibodies result in a form of gluten sensitivity in which a cellular response to Triticeae glutens that are crosslinked to tTG are able to stimulate transglutaminase specific B-cell responses that eventually result in the production of anti-transglutaminase antibodies IgA and IgG. tTG specifically deamidates the glutamine residues creating epitopes that increase the binding affinity of the gluten peptide to the antigen presenting T cells, initiating an adaptive immune response.

Cancer 
Recent studies suggest that tTG also plays a role in inflammation and tumor biology. tTG expression is elevated in multiple cancer cell types and is implicated in drug resistance and metastasis due to its ability to promote mesenchymal transition and stem cell like properties. In its GTP bound form, tTG contributes to cancer cell survival and appears to be a cancer driver. tTG is upregulated in cancer cells and tissues in many cancer types, including leukemia, breast cancer, prostate cancer, pancreatic cancer and cervical cancer. Higher tTG expression also correlates with higher instances of metastasis, chemotherapy resistance, lower survival rates and generally poor prognosis.  Cancer cells can be killed by increasing calcium levels through the activation of tTG transamidation activity. Preclinical trials have showed promise in using tTG inhibitors as anti-cancer therapeutic agents. However, other studies  have noted that tTG transamidation activity could be linked to the inhibition of tumor cell invasiveness.

Other Diseases 
tTG is believed to contribute to several neurodegenerative disorders including Alzheimer, Parkinson and Huntington diseases by affecting transcription, differentiation and migration and adhesion . Such neurological diseases are characterized in part by the abnormal aggregation of proteins due to the increased activity of protein crosslinking in the affected brain. Additionally, specific proteins associated with these disorders have been found to be in vivo and in vitro substrates of tTG.
Although tTG is up regulated in the areas of the brain affected by Huntington's disease, a recent study showed that increasing  levels of tTG do not affect the onset and/or progression of the disease in mice.
Recent studies show that tTG may not be involved in AD as studies show it is associated with erythrocyte lysis and is a consequence of the disease rather than a cause.

tTG has also been linked to the pathogenesis of fibrosis in various organs including the lung and the kidney. Specifically, in kidney fibrosis, tTG contributes to the stabilization and accumulation of the ECM affecting TGF beta activity.

Diagnostic 

Serology for anti-tTG antibodies has superseded older serological tests (anti-endomysium, anti-gliadin, and anti-reticulin) and has a strong sensitivity (99%) and specificity (>90%) for identifying celiac disease. Modern anti-tTG assays rely on a human recombinant protein as an antigen.

Therapeutic 

It's still experimental to use tTG as a form of surgical glue. It is also being studied as an attenuator of metastasis in certain tumors. tTG shows promise as a potential therapeutic target to treat cardiac fibrosis, through the activity of a highly selective tTG inhibitor. tTG inhibitors have also been shown to inhibit the formation of toxic inclusions related to neurodegenerative diseases. This indicates that tTG inhibitors could also serve as a tool to mitigate the progression of tTG brain related diseases.

Interactions 

TG2 participates in both enzymatic and non-enzymatic interactions. Enzymatic interactions are formed between TG2 and its substrate proteins containing the glutamine donor and lysine donor groups in the presence of calcium. Substrates of TG2 are known to affect TG2 activity, which enables it to subsequently execute diverse biological functions in the cell. However, the importance of non-enzymatic interactions in regulating TG2 activities is yet to be revealed. Recent studies indicate that non-enzymatic interactions play physiological roles and enable diverse TG2 functions in a context-specific manner.

References

External links 
Endomysial antibodies
 A collection of substrates and interaction partners of TG2 is accessible in the TRANSDAB, an interactive transglutaminase substrate database.

EC 2.3.2
Autoantigens